The 1960 NCAA Skiing Championships were contested at Bridger Bowl near Bozeman, Montana, at the seventh annual NCAA-sanctioned ski tournament to determine the individual and team national champions of men's collegiate alpine skiing, cross-country skiing, and ski jumping in the United States. Montana State College served as the hosts.

Colorado, coached by Bob Beattie, repeated as national champions, again edging out rival Denver in the team standings. This was the second title for the Buffaloes.

There were no repeat individual champions this year, but downhill winner Dave Butts of Colorado won his third title; the McCall, Idaho native took the jumping and Skimeister honors the previous year.

Venue

This year's championships were held March 24–26 in Montana at Bridger Bowl, north of Bozeman.  Montana State College, located in Bozeman, served as hosts.

The seventh edition of the championships, these were the first in Montana.

Team scoring

Individual events

Four events were held, which yielded seven individual titles.
Thursday: Slalom
Friday: Downhill, Cross Country
Saturday: Jumping

See also
List of NCAA skiing programs

References

NCAA Skiing Championships
NCAA Skiing Championships
NCAA Skiing Championships
NCAA Skiing Championships
NCAA Skiing Championships
NCAA Skiing Championships
NCAA Skiing Championships
Skiing in Montana